Ba'dan District is a district of the Ibb Governorate, Yemen. As of 2003, the district had a population of 116,045 inhabitants.

See also
Baʽadan mountain

References

Districts of Ibb Governorate
Ba'dan District